The Cheltenham Festival is a horse racing-based meeting in the National Hunt racing calendar in the United Kingdom, with race prize money second only to the Grand National. The four-day festival takes place annually in March at Cheltenham Racecourse in Cheltenham, Gloucestershire. It usually coincides with Saint Patrick's Day and is particularly popular with Irish visitors.

The meeting features several Grade I races including the Cheltenham Gold Cup, Champion Hurdle, Queen Mother Champion Chase and Stayers' Hurdle. Large amounts of money are gambled; hundreds of millions of pounds are bet over the course of the week. Cheltenham is noted for its atmosphere, including the "Cheltenham roar", which refers to the enormous amount of noise that the crowd generates as the starter raises the tape for the first race of the festival.

History

Origins

The Cheltenham Festival originated in 1860 when the National Hunt Chase was first held at Market Harborough. It was initially titled the Grand National Hunt Meeting and took place at several locations since its institution, at the turn of the 20th century it was mostly held at Warwick Racecourse. In 1904 and 1905 it was staged at Cheltenham over a new course established at Prestbury Park in 1902, having previously taken place at Cheltenham in 1861. From 1906 to 1910 it was again held at Warwick but further additions and major improvements made at Cheltenham by Messrs. Pratt and Company, including a new stand (the fourth one), miles of drain to prevent unsuitable racing ground, tar paving in the enclosures and the paddock extended to 35 saddling boxes, proved enough to make the National Hunt Committee decide on that the 1911 meeting was to return at Prestbury Park, Cheltenham where it remained to the present day. The earliest traceable reference to a "Festival" is in the Warwick Advertiser of 1907.

The Stayers' Hurdle, which first ran in 1912, is the oldest race from the Cheltenham festival that is currently a championship race. The Gold Cup, established in 1924, was originally a supporting race for the County Hurdle. This was the main event of the first day but that quickly changed, and in the following seasons it became a championship race. For many years it was still used by the trainers as a preparation race for the Grand National. The Champion Hurdle first ran in 1927 and the Queen Mother Champion Chase in 1959; they were both championship races from the time they were introduced, unlike the Stayers' Hurdle and Gold Cup.

Races

Until 2005 the festival had traditionally been held over the course of three days, but this changed with the introduction of a fourth day, meaning there would be one championship race on each day, climaxing with the Gold Cup on the Friday. To ensure each day would still have six races, five new races were introduced. Four further races have since been added, bringing the total to 28 races overall, with grade one events including the Champion Bumper, Triumph Hurdle, Ryanair Chase, Supreme Novices' Hurdle, Neptune Investment Management Novices' Hurdle, Arkle Challenge Trophy, RSA Chase, Champion Hurdle, World Hurdle, Queen Mother Champion Chase and the feature race, the Gold Cup. The festival also includes one of the two biggest Hunter Chases of the season, the Foxhunters', which is run on the Friday over the same course as the Gold Cup.

Unlike Royal Ascot and many other top flat racing events in Great Britain and Ireland, the Cheltenham Festival does not have a history of attracting many international contenders, though French-trained horses have done well. Baracouda was perhaps the best known, after landing the Stayers' Hurdle twice.

Notable events

1983–2019

In 1983 Caroline Beasley became the first female jockey to ride a winner at the Festival. She won the Foxhunter Chase on Eliogarty.

On 17 March 1987, 21-year-old Gee Armytage won the Kim Muir Challenge Cup, back then held on Tuesdays and backed it with another victory the next day in the Mildmay of Flete Challenge Cup on a horse aptly named Gee-A, becoming the first female jockey to win a race against professionals at the Festival..

In 2001 the Festival was cancelled due to an outbreak of foot-and-mouth disease in Britain. The meeting had initially been postponed to April, but when a case of the disease was confirmed locally, putting the racecourse within an exclusion zone, all racing had to be called off.

In 2008, the second day of the festival was cancelled due to heavy storms. The races scheduled for that day were instead run on the third and final days. In 2019 a record opening day crowd of 67,934 people attended.

2020 coronavirus pandemic

Despite the COVID-19 pandemic, and in line with government advice, the festival went ahead from 10 to 13 March 2020. The World Health Organization declared the outbreak a pandemic on 11 March. On 16 March, three days after the festival, the British government advised against large gatherings and on 23 March ordered a lockdown. The festival attracted 251,684 visitors that year, including a final-day crowd of 68,859, fewer than 2,000 down on the previous year's record.

There were fears in early April that the festival had helped spread the disease widely across the country. One visitor who developed COVID-19 later complained about having been "packed like sardines". Hundreds of festival visitors also said that they had developed symptoms. Gloucestershire Hospitals NHS Foundation Trust, which covers Cheltenham, recorded 125 deaths, roughly double that in two nearby trusts at Bristol (58 each), and those covering Swindon (67) and Bath (46).

Horse-welfare concerns
For several years there have been concerns about the number of horse injuries and fatalities. In 2006, 11 horses died. In response the racecourse decreased the number of runners in certain races and re-sited one of the more difficult fences.

On the opening day of the 2012 festival, three horses were euthanised after suffering bone fractures or breaks, including two during the Cross-Country Chase, becoming the second and third equine fatalities in that race since 2000. Another two horses died during the festival.

At the 2018 festival there were six horse deaths, leading to a BHA review into equine safety. The review was published in December 2018 and listed 17 recommendations for future Cheltenham fixtures and jump racing in general, including reduced field size numbers at Cheltenham and a pre-race veterinary check for all runners at the festival. At the 2019 festival there were three horse deaths, leading to another BHA review.

2023 races
The number and type of races at the Cheltenham Festival has changed dramatically over the years of its existence.  In particular, it has grown from a two-day meeting to a four-day meeting. In 2023, there will be 28 races as follows:

Top jockeys
The top jockey for the festival is the jockey who wins the most races over the four days. The winners since 1980, with wins in brackets, are:

 2023 Paul Townend (5)
 2022 Paul Townend (5)
 2021 Rachael Blackmore (6)
 2020 Paul Townend (5)
 2019 Nico de Boinville (3)
 2018 Davy Russell (4)
 2017 Ruby Walsh (4)
 2016 Ruby Walsh (7)
 2015 Ruby Walsh (4)
 2014 Ruby Walsh (3)
 2013 Ruby Walsh (4)
 2012 Barry Geraghty (5)
 2011 Ruby Walsh (5)
 2010 Ruby Walsh (3)
 2009 Ruby Walsh (7)
 2008 Ruby Walsh (3)
 2007 Robert Thornton (4)
 2006 Ruby Walsh (3)
 2005 Graham Lee (3)
 2004 Ruby Walsh (3)
 2003 Barry Geraghty (5)
 2002 Richard Johnson (2)
 2001: Festival cancelled
 2000 Mick Fitzgerald (4)
 1999 Mick Fitzgerald (4)
 1998 Tony McCoy (5)
 1997 Tony McCoy (3)
 1996 Richard Dunwoody (2)
 1995 Norman Williamson (4)
 1994 Charlie Swan (3)
 1993 Charlie Swan (4)
 1992 Jamie Osborne (5)
 1991 Peter Scudamore (2)
 1990 Richard Dunwoody (2)
 1989 Tom Morgan (2)
 1988 Simon Sherwood (2)
 1987 Peter Scudamore (2)
 1986 Peter Scudamore (2)
 1985 Steve Smith Eccles (3)
 1984 Jonjo O'Neill (2)
 1983 Graham Bradley (2)
 1982 Jonjo O'Neill (1)
 1981 John Francome (3)
 1980 Jim Wilson (3)

Leading trainers
The leading trainer for the festival is the trainer who trains the most winners in the races over the four days. The winners since 1997, with wins in brackets, are:

 2023 Willie Mullins (6)
 2022 Willie Mullins (10)
 2021 Willie Mullins (6)
 2020 Willie Mullins (7)
 2019 Willie Mullins (4)
 2018 Gordon Elliott (8)
 2017 Gordon Elliott (6)
 2016 Willie Mullins (7)
 2015 Willie Mullins (8)
 2014 Willie Mullins (4)
 2013 Willie Mullins (5)
 2012 Nicky Henderson (7)
 2011 Willie Mullins (4)
 2010 Nicky Henderson (3)
 2009 Paul Nicholls (5)
 2008 Paul Nicholls (3)
 2007 Paul Nicholls (4)
 2006 Paul Nicholls (3)
 2005 Howard Johnson (3)
 2004 Paul Nicholls (4)
 2003 Jonjo O'Neill (3)
 2002 Martin Pipe (3)
 2001: Festival cancelled
 2000 Nicky Henderson (4)
 1999 Paul Nicholls (3)
 1998 Martin Pipe (4)
 1997 Martin Pipe (4)

See also
 Horse racing in Great Britain
 List of British National Hunt races
 Cheltenham Gold Cup

References

External links

 

Sports competitions in England
Festival
Horse racing meetings in Great Britain
Recurring sporting events established in 1902
Equestrian festivals
Festivals established in 1860
March sporting events
Events in Gloucestershire
COVID-19 pandemic in the United Kingdom